The Book of Micah is the sixth of the twelve minor prophets in the Hebrew Bible. Ostensibly, it records the sayings of Micah, whose name is Mikayahu, meaning "Who is like Yahweh?", an 8th-century BCE prophet from the village of Moresheth in Judah (Hebrew name from the opening verse: מיכה המרשתי).

The book has three major divisions, chapters 1–2, 3–5 and 6–7, each introduced by the word "Hear," with a pattern of alternating announcements of doom and expressions of hope within each division. Micah reproaches unjust leaders, defends the rights of the poor against the rich and powerful; while looking forward to a world at peace centered on Zion under the leadership of a new Davidic monarch.

While the book is relatively short, it includes lament (1.8–16; 7.8–10), theophany (1.3–4), hymnic prayer of petition and confidence (7.14–20), and the "covenant lawsuit" (6.1–8), a distinct genre in which Yahweh (God) sues Israel for breach of contract of the Mosaic covenant.

Setting

Chapter 1:1 identifies the prophet as "Micah of Moresheth" (a town in southern Judah), and states that he lived during the reigns of Jotham, Ahaz and Hezekiah, roughly 750–700 BCE.

This corresponds to the period when, after a long period of peace, Israel, Judah, and the other nations of the region came under increasing pressure from the aggressive and rapidly expanding Neo-Assyrian empire. Between 734 and 727 Tiglath-Pileser III of Assyria conducted almost annual campaigns in Palestine, reducing the Kingdom of Israel, the Kingdom of Judah and the Philistine cities to vassalage, receiving tribute from Ammon, Moab and Edom, and absorbing Damascus (the Kingdom of Aram) into the Empire. On Tiglath-Pileser's death Israel rebelled, resulting in an Assyrian counter-attack and the destruction of the capital, Samaria, in 721 after a three-year siege. Micah 1:2–7 draws on this event: Samaria, says the prophet, has been destroyed by God because of its crimes of idolatry, oppression of the poor, and misuse of power. The Assyrian attacks on Israel (the northern kingdom) led to an influx of refugees into Judah, which would have increased social stresses, while at the same time the authorities in Jerusalem had to invest huge amounts in tribute and defense.

When the Assyrians attacked Judah in 701 they did so via the Philistine coast and the Shephelah, the border region which included Micah's village of Moresheth, as well as Lachish, Judah's second largest city. This in turn forms the background to verses 1:8–16, in which Micah warns the towns of the coming disaster (Lachish is singled out for special mention, accused of the corrupt practices of both Samaria and Jerusalem). In verses 2:1–5 he denounces the appropriation of land and houses, which might simply be the greed of the wealthy and powerful, or possibly the result of the militarizing of the area in preparation for the Assyrian attack.

Composition

Some, but not all, scholars accept that only chapters 1–3 contain material from the late 8th century prophet Micah. The latest material comes from the post-Exilic period after the Temple was rebuilt in 515 BCE, so that the early 5th century BCE seems to be the period when the book was completed. The first stage was the collection and arrangement of some spoken sayings of the historical Micah (the material in chapters 1–3), in which the prophet attacks those who build estates through oppression and depicts the Assyrian invasion of Judah as Yahweh's punishment on the kingdom's corrupt rulers, including a prophecy that the Temple will be destroyed.

The prophecy was not fulfilled in Micah's time, but a hundred years later when Judah was facing a similar crisis with the Neo-Babylonian Empire, Micah's prophecies were reworked and expanded to reflect the new situation. Still later, after Jerusalem did fall to the Neo-Babylonian Empire, the book was revised and expanded further to reflect the circumstances of the late exilic and post-exilic community.

Content

Structure
At the broadest level, Micah can be divided into three roughly equal parts:
 Judgment against the nations and their leaders
 Restoration of Zion (chapters 4–5, probably exilic and post-exilic, together with the next section);
 God's lawsuit against Israel and expression of hope (chapters 6–7).

Within this broad three-part structure are a series of alternating oracles of judgment and promises of restoration:
 1.1 Superscription
 1.2–2.11 Oracles of judgment
 2.12–13 Oracles of restoration
 3.1–12 Oracles of judgment
 4.1–5.15 Oracles of restoration
 6.1–7.6 Oracles of judgment
 7.7–20 Oracles of restoration

Subsections
 The Heading (1:1): As is typical of prophetic books, an anonymous editor has supplied the name of the prophet, an indication of his time of activity, and an identification of his speech as the "word of Yahweh", a generic term carrying a claim to prophetic legitimacy and authority. Samaria and Jerusalem are given prominence as the foci of the prophet's attention.
 Judgment against Samaria (1:2–7): Drawing upon ancient traditions for depicting a theophany, the prophet depicts the coming of Yahweh to punish the city, whose sins are idolatry and the abuse of the poor.
 Warnings to the cities of Judah (1:8–16): Samaria has fallen, Judah is next. Micah describes the destruction of the lesser towns of Judah (referring to the invasion of Judah by Sennacherib, 701 BCE). For these passages of doom on the various cities, paronomasia is used. Paronomasia is a literary device which 'plays' on the sound of each word for literary effect. For example, the inhabitants of Beth-le-aphrah ("house of dust") are told to "roll yourselves in the dust." 1:14. Though most of the Paronomasia is lost in translation, it is the equivalent of 'Ashdod shall be but ashes,' where the fate of the city matches its name.
 Misuse of power denounced (2:1–5): Denounces those who appropriate the land and houses of others. The context may be simply the amassing wealth for its own sake, or could be connected with the militarisation of the region for the expected Assyrian attack.
 Threats against the prophet (2:6–11): The prophet is warned not to prophesy. He answers that the rulers are harming God's people, and want to listen only to those who advocate the virtues of wine.
 A later promise (2:12–13): These verses assume that judgment has already fallen and Israel is already scattered abroad.
 Judgment on wicked Zion (3:1–4): Israel's rulers are accused of gaining more wealth at the expense of the poor, by any means. The metaphor of flesh being torn illustrates the length to which the ruling classes and socialites would go to further increase their wealth. Prophets are corrupt, seeking personal gain. Jerusalem's rulers believe that God will always be with them, but God will be with his people, and Jerusalem will be destroyed.
 Zion's future hope (4:1–5) This is a later passage, almost identical with Isaiah 2:2–4. Zion (meaning the Temple) will be rebuilt, but by God, and based not on violence and corruption but on the desire to learn God's laws, beat swords to ploughshares and live in peace.
 Further promises to Zion (4:6–7) This is another later passage, promising Zion that she will once more enjoy her former independence and power.
 Deliverance from Distress in Babylon (4:9–5:1) The similarities to Isaiah 41:15–16 and the references to Babylon suggest the period of this material, although it is unclear whether a period during or after the siege of 586 is meant. Despite their trials, God will not desert his people.
 The promised ruler from Bethlehem (5:1–14): This passage is usually dated to the exile. Although chapters 4:9–10 have said that there is "no king in Zion", these chapters predict the coming Messiah will emerge from Bethlehem, the traditional home of the Davidic monarchy, to restore Israel. Assyria will be stricken, and Israel's punishment will lead to the punishment of the nations.
 A Covenant lawsuit (6:1–5): Yahweh accuses Israel (the people of Judah) of breaking the covenant through their lack of justice and honesty, after the pattern of the kings of Israel (northern kingdom).
 Torah Liturgy (6:6–8): Micah speaks on behalf of the community asking what they should do in order to get back on God's good side. Micah then responds by saying that God requires only "to do justice, and to love mercy, and to walk humbly with your God." Thus declaring that the burnt offering of both animals and humans (which may have been practiced in Judah under Kings Ahaz and Manasseh) is not necessary for God.
 The City as a Cheat (6:9–16): The city is reprimanded for its dishonest trade practices.
 Lament (7:1–7): The first passage in the book in the first person: whether it comes from Micah himself is disputed. Honesty and decency have vanished, families are filled with strife.
 A song of fallen Jerusalem (7:8–10): The first person voice continues, but now it is the city who speaks. She recognises that her destruction is deserved punishment from God. The recognition gives grounds for hope that God is still with her.
 A prophecy of restoration (7:11–13): Fallen Jerusalem is promised that she will be rebuilt and that her power will be greater than ever (a contrast with the vision of peace in 4:1–5).
 A prayer for future prosperity (7:14–17): The mood switches from a request for power to grateful astonishment at God's mercy. Hermann Gunkel and Bo Reicke identify the last chapter as a ritual text possibly connected to festivals.

Themes 
Micah addresses the future of Judah/Israel after the Babylonian exile. Like Isaiah, the book has a vision of the punishment of Israel and creation of a "remnant", followed by world peace centered on Zion under the leadership of a new Davidic monarch; the people should do justice, turn to Yahweh, and await the end of their punishment. However, whereas Isaiah sees Jacob/Israel joining "the nations" under Yahweh's rule, Micah looks forward to Israel ruling over the nations. Insofar as Micah appears to draw on and rework parts of Isaiah, it seems designed at least partly to provide a counterpoint to that book.

Quotations in the New Testament
In the New Testament, the Book of Matthew quotes from the Book of Micah in relation to Jesus being born in Bethlehem:

Jesus quotes Micah when he warns that families will be divided by the gospel:

In the New Testament, the Book of John is a possible alluding to the identification of the mysterious "him" that God causes to see marvels or marvelous things:

See also 
 Zion

References

Bibliography

Further reading 
 "Book of Micah." The Anchor Bible Dictionary. Vol. 4, Editor-in-Chief: Freedman, David N. Doubleday; New York. 1992.
 "Book of Micah." International Standard Bible Encyclopedia. General Editor: Bromley, G.W. William B. Erdmans Publishing Co.; Grand Rapids, MI. 1986.
 “ Book of Micah”  Forward Movement Publications, Cincinnati, OH, 2007
 Holy Bible: The New Oxford Annotated Bible. Coogan; Oxford University Press, 2007.
 LaSor, William Sanford et al. Old Testament Survey: the Message, Form, and Background of the Old Testament. Grand Rapids: William B. Eerdmans, 1996.
 Hailey, Homer. (1973). A Commentary on the Minor Prophets. Grand Rapids: Baker Book House. 
 Maxey, Al. The Minor Prophets: Micah. (n.d.). 20 Paragraphs. Retrieved October 4, 2005, from Micah
 McKeating, Henry Engel. (1971). The Books of Amos, Hosea, and Micah. New York: the Syndics of the Cambridge University Press.
 Pusey, E.B. (1963). The Minor Prophets: A Commentary (Vol. II). Grand Rapids: Baker Book House.
 Wood, Joyce Rilett. (2000). "Speech and action in Micah's prophecy". Catholic Biblical Quarterly, no. 4(62), 49 paragraphs. Retrieved September 30, 2005, from OCLC (FirstSearch) database FirstSearch Login Screen

External links 

 Jewish translations:
 Michah – Micah (Judaica Press) translation [with Rashi's commentary] at Chabad.org
 Christian translations:
 Online Bible at GospelHall.org (ESV, KJV, Darby, American Standard Version, Bible in Basic English)
 BibleGateway.com (New International Version)
 Micah at The Great Books (New Revised Standard Version)
  Various versions

 
8th-century BC books
5th-century BC books
Twelve Minor Prophets